The white-eyed stipplethroat or white-eyed antwren (Epinecrophylla leucophthalma) is a species of bird in the family Thamnophilidae. It was formerly placed in the genus Myrmotherula. It is found in Bolivia, Brazil, and Peru. Its natural habitat is subtropical or tropical moist lowland forest.

The white-eyed stipplethroat was described by the Austrian ornithologist August von Pelzeln in 1868 and given the binomial name Formicivora leucophthalma.

There are four subspecies:
 Epinecrophylla leucophthalma dissita (Bond, 1950) - Bolivia and Peru
 Epinecrophylla leucophthalma leucophthalma (Pelzeln, 1868) - Bolivia, Brazil, and Peru
 Epinecrophylla leucophthalma phaeonota (Todd, 1927) - Brazil
 Epinecrophylla leucophthalma sordida (Todd, 1927) - Brazil

References

Further reading
 Isler, M., D. Lacerda, P. Isler, S. Hackett, K. Rosenberg, and R. Brumfield (2006). Epinecrophylla, a new genus of antwrens (Aves: Passeriformes: Thamnophilidae). Proceedings of the Biological Society of Washington 119(4): 522-527

white-eyed stipplethroat
Birds of the Amazon Basin
white-eyed stipplethroat
Taxonomy articles created by Polbot